"The Outside-In Man" is the twenty-second episode of the third series of the 1960s cult British spy-fi television series The Avengers, starring Patrick Macnee and Honor Blackman. It was first broadcast by ABC on 22 February 1964. The episode was directed by Jonathan Alwyn and written by Philip Chambers.

Plot
Steed finds himself protecting a British defector, formerly Steed's target and now an enemy diplomat, from an assassin. Selling a used car is part of the scheme.

Cast
 Patrick Macnee as John Steed
 Honor Blackman as Cathy Gale
 Ronald Radd as Quilpie 
 James Maxwell as Mark Charter 
 William Devlin as Ambassador 
 Basil Hoskins as Major Zulficar 
 Beryl Baxter as Helen Rayner 
 Arthur Lovegrove as Michael Lynden 
 Virginia Stride as Alice Brisket 
 Philip Anthony as General Sharp 
 Anthony Dawes as Edwards 
 Ronald Mansell as Jenkins 
 Valentino Musetti as Guard 
 Eddie Powell as Guard 
 Paul Blomley as Butcher

References

External links

Episode overview on The Avengers Forever! website

The Avengers (season 3) episodes
1964 British television episodes